The Genesee County B League was a high school sport league in Genesee County Michigan that operated in the mid to late 20th century.

References 

Michigan high school sports conferences